The twin-spot fritillary (Brenthis hecate) is a butterfly in the family Nymphalidae.

Description

Brenthis hecate is a large fritillary with a wingspan reaching  and bright orange uppersides of the wings. The underside of the hindwings shows a double parallel line of brown spots (hence the common name). The flight period extends from May to early August. The larva feeds on Filipendula ulmaria and Dorycnium.

Distribution
Brenthis hecate is found in south-western Europe, Lithuania, southern Russia, the Balkans, Asia Minor, Iran and Central Asia.

Habitat

External links
Leps It
"Brenthis Hübner, [1819]" at Markku Savela's Lepidoptera and Some Other Life Forms
Moths and Butterflies of Europe and North Africa
Butterfly Guide

Argynnini
Butterflies of Asia
Butterflies of Europe
Butterflies described in 1775